Charles Crosby may refer to:

Charles A. Crosby, former mayor of the town of Yarmouth, Nova Scotia, Canada
Charles N. Crosby (1876–1951), U.S. Representative from Pennsylvania
Charles F. Crosby (1847–1889), American politician and lawyer